Digimon Fusion, known in Japan as , is the sixth series of the anime series of the Digimon franchise, produced by Toei Animation. It aired in Japan on TV Asahi on July 6, 2010. Nickelodeon aired the series in the United States on September 7, 2013. Nicktoons aired the series on October 13, 2013 with a marathon of the first four episodes. Nickelodeon soon shifted the series to the sister network known as Nicktoons. The CW's Vortexx aired the series on January 25, 2014. It ran all 30 episodes of season 1 before leaving The CW on September 27, 2014 of that year following Vortexx's discontinuation.

The opening theme for the first part is Sonar Pocket's . The series also features original music by Kousuke Yamashita as well as various insert songs sung by Kōji Wada.


Episode listing

References

General

External links
 TV Asahi's official Digimon Xros Wars website
 Toei Animation's official Digimon Xros Wars  website

2010 Japanese television seasons
2011 Japanese television seasons
Fusion (season 1)